The 2017–18 Seton Hall Pirates women's basketball team represented Seton Hall University during the 2017–18 NCAA Division I women's basketball season. The Pirates, led by fifth year head coach Anthony Bozzella, played their home games in South Orange, New Jersey at the Walsh Gymnasium as members of the Big East Conference. They finished the season 16–16, 7–11 in Big East play to finish in seventh place. They advanced to the quarterfinals of the Big East women's tournament where they lost to DePaul. They received an at-large berth in the WNIT where they lost to Saint Joseph's in the first round.

Previous season
They finished the season 12–19, 4–14 in Big East play to finish in a tie for seventh place. They advance to the quarterfinals of the Big East women's tournament where they lost to DePaul.

Roster

Schedule

|-
!colspan=9 style=| Exhibition

|-
!colspan=9 style=| Non-conference regular season

|-
!colspan=9 style=| Big East regular season

|-
!colspan=9 style=| Big East Women's Tournament

|-
!colspan=9 style=| WNIT

See also
 2017–18 Seton Hall Pirates men's basketball team

References

Seton Hall
Seton Hall Pirates women's basketball seasons
Seton